The marine waters of the Houtman Abrolhos, an island chain off the coast of Western Australia, are unusual in containing a mix of tropical, subtropical and warm-temperate fish species. This mix is largely due to the Leeuwin Current, which brings warm tropical water to the Houtman Abrolhos, especially in winter. Tropical species are the most abundant, eleven of the sixteen most abundant species being tropical fishes. However, there are also a large number of tropical species with populations so small that they are thought not to maintain populations be breeding at the Houtman Abrolhos.

References

'Houtman Abrolhos
fishes
Houtman Abrolhos
fishes of the Houtman Abrolhos